Diamond dust is a meteorological phenomenon, also known as ice crystals.

Diamond dust may also refer to:

Arts, entertainment and media

Books
Sweet Diamond Dust: And Other Stories, a 1996 short story collection by Rosario Ferré 
Diamond Dust and Other Stories, a 2000 short story collection by Anita Desai
Diamond Dust, a 2002 mystery by Peter Lovesey

Film
Diamond Dust (2018 film), a 2018 Egyptian film
Bleach: The DiamondDust Rebellion, the second animated film adaptation of the anime and manga series Bleach

Music
"Diamond Dust", a 1975 song by Jeff Beck from Blow by Blow 
"Diamond Dust", a 2017 song by Way Out West from Tuesday Maybe

Other uses
Diamond dust, a wrestling maneuver innovated by Masato Tanaka
Diamond Dust, the codename of a nuclear test conducted as part of Operation Mandrel and Project Vela Uniform
Diamond Dust, glitter particles developed by artist Stuart Semple

See also
 Diamond powder, small diamonds used as an abrasive